West Nakhalpara is a densely populated area in Tejgaon.

Important areas of West Nakhalpara
1. Prime Minister's Office (Bangladesh)
2. Nakhalpara MP Hostel.
3. SSF officer's quarter.
4. Shia Mosque & Graveyard complex.
5. Rahimafrooz Battery Headquarter.
6. Loacus More.
7. Banker's Row.
8. Alenberi Row.
9. Nakhalpara Sub Post Office.
10.Nakhalpara Rail-Gate.

Mosques in West Nakhalpara
1.Nakhalpara Baitul Atiq Jame Mosjid.
2.Nakhalpara Baro Jame Mosjid.
3.Nakhalpara Hazrat Belal(RA) Mosjid & Madrasha Complex
4.Nakhalpara Baitul M'amur Jame Mosjid.

Schools in West Nakhalpara
1.Nakhalpara Government Primary School
2.Nakhalpara Hossain Ali High School

Its coordinates are

References

Neighbourhoods in Bangladesh